Yosef Zvi HaLevy (:  1874 – 13 March 1960) was an Israeli rabbi and head of the rabbinical court for Tel Aviv-Yafo.

Biography
HaLevy was born in 1874 in Vilijampolė, Kaunas, Lithuania, then part of the Russian Empire, and was the son of Rabbi Avraham HaLevy. He obtained his rabbinical ordination (semicha) from Slabodka yeshiva.

He emigrated without his family to Ottoman Palestine at the beginning of 1891 and shortly thereafter married the daughter of Rabbi Naftali Herz Halevy, the Chief Rabbi of Jaffa. In 1894 (or late 1893), he moved to Jerusalem, but returned to Jaffa in about 1897.

HaLevy was later appointed to serve as the head (Av Beit Din) of the Tel Aviv Rabbinical Court.

Awards 
 In 1958, HaLevy was awarded the Israel Prize, in Rabbinical literature.

Halevy's grandson, Abraham Haim Halevy, was the recipient of the 2002 Israel Prize, for agriculture.

References

See also
List of Israel Prize recipients
Halevy

1874 births
1960 deaths
Clergy from Kaunas
Lithuanian Jews
Rabbis in Mandatory Palestine
Emigrants from the Russian Empire to the Ottoman Empire
20th-century Israeli rabbis
Israel Prize Rabbi recipients
Israel Prize in Rabbinical literature recipients